The following is a list of Sites of Special Scientific Interest in the Falkirk and Clackmannan Area of Search.  For other areas, see List of SSSIs by Area of Search.

 Avon Gorge
 Back Burn Wood and Meadows
 Blawhorn Moss
 Bo'Mains Meadow
 Carriber Glen
 Carron Dams
 Carron Glen
 Craig Leith and Myreton Hill
 Craigmad Wood
 Damhead Wood
 Darnrig Moss
 Denny Muir
 Devon Gorge
 Dollar Glen
 Firth of Forth
 Gartmorn Dam
 Howierig Muir
 Linn Mill
 Mill Glen
 Slamannan Plateau

 
Falkirk and Clackmannan